Crinalium epipsammum is a filamentous, non-heterocystous, terrestrial cyanobacterium. The species is highly drought-resistant and was first identified from its role in forming crusts on coastal sand dunes in the Netherlands.

References

Bacteria described in 1992
Oscillatoriales